Puregold Price Club, Inc. or simply Puregold (stylized in all caps) is a chain of supermarkets in the Philippines trading goods such as consumer products (canned goods, housewares, toiletries, dry goods, and food products, among others) on a wholesale and retail basis. It currently has approximately 280 operating stores and over 20 food service stalls.

History 
Puregold was founded on September 8, 1998 by Chinese-Filipino businessman Lucio Co, and opened its first branch along Shaw Boulevard, Mandaluyong on December 12, 1998.

In October 2011, Puregold Price Club went public and was inaugurated as a listing on the Philippine Stock Exchange.

In 2012, Puregold acquired Kareila Management Corp., which owns S&R Membership Shopping (named after Price Club founders Sol and Robert Price) and Parco. Over 19 operating outlets were purchased and converted to Puregold. The shareholders of the retail chain Puregold have approved the merger of the other two operating units into the parent company, consolidating Puregold's supermarket businesses under the publicly listed supermarket operator.

In February 2013, global investment firm Capital Group Companies (CGC) bought 5.4% total outstanding stock of Puregold.

In May 2014, Puregold formed a joint venture with Japanese convenience store chain Lawson under the name PG Lawson Inc. Puregold owns 70% of the venture and they opened their first branch in San Andres, Manila on March 30, 2015.

References

External links

Official website

Retail companies established in 1998
Supermarkets of the Philippines
Companies listed on the Philippine Stock Exchange
Companies based in Manila
1998 establishments in the Philippines